Nechkinsky National Park is an important biological and cultural reserve of Udmurtia (the Udmurt Republic), situated in the middle valley of the Kama River, its tributary the Siva River, and the coastal part of the Votkinsk reservoir.  This places Nechkinsky on the western side of the central Ural Mountains. The territory is mostly forest and river floodplains, with a number of ancient archaeological sites on the grounds.  It is near the city of Izhevsk.

Topography
The park covers a forested valley of the watershed of the Siva River, a tributary of the Kama.  The valley is about 110–160 meters deep, and 3–20 km wide.  It is asymmetrical, in that the left bank is flat, and the right bank is steep hillside.  The Kama River at this point has a wide floodplain, with several fluvial terraces at higher levels.

Ecoregion and climate
The ecoregion of Nechkinsky is Sarmatic mixed forests (WWF ID#436). This ecoregion is a strip of low forests, lakes and wetlands, running from the Baltic Sea east to the Urals.  Forest cover is typically mixed conifer and deciduous trees, with large unbroken tracts under pressure from agriculture. 

The climate of Nechkinsky is Humid continental climate, warm summer (Köppen climate classification (Dfb)). This climate is characterized by large swings in temperature, both diurnally and seasonally, with mild summers and cold, snowy winters.  Average temperatures range from 10 F in January to 66 F in July. Annual precipitation averages 20 inches.

Plants
The forest communities are a mixture of taiga, mixed forests and steppe-forests.  On the lower levels there are oligotrophic and mesotrophic bogs. In the gullies and depressions there are Siberian spruce and associated species. On both the left and right banks of the Siva River there are pine forests, with some stands of silver fir and Siberian larch.  In the lower levels the forest cover is broadleaf (oak) communities, with secondary cover of birch and aspen. The park records 712 species of vascular plants, representing 70% of the species found in Udmurtia. The wetlands of the Siva include the Kemulskoye bog (2 thousand hectares).

Animals
A census of species in the park in 2002 recorded 50 mammals, 191 birds, 5 reptiles, 8 amphibians, 37 fish.  Special studies of were done of mollusks (33 species), spiders (120 species), beetles (600 species), butterflies (500 species) and dragonflies (25 species). Rare species include the vulnerable Russian desman, a semi-aquatic large mole that looks like a muskrat and is under protection because of historical trapping for its fur.

History
Early settlements sites of ancient hunters and fishers (3rd - 2nd millennium BCE) have been excavated in the park.  The earliest identifiable archaeological sites are the remains of fortified Iron Age settlements from the first millennium BCE, associated with the Ananyino culture. The Ananyino were an early Finno-Ugric languages people.

Tourism
There are several educational trails developed around ecological themes of a particular habitat or geological type; park employees are available as guides on these trails.  The park has one long developed hiking trail (Tourist route "Dear Ancestors", 25 km) that has four rest areas along the route, two observation decks for views of the reservoir, and passages along old trails used by peasants in former times.  There are two access points for bathing in the Kama River.  There are also two ski trails and five auto routes (for which written passes must be obtained from the forest administration office.

See also
 Protected areas of Russia

References

External links
  Zone Map of Nechkinsky National Park

National parks of Russia